Passing Shadows is a 1934 British mystery film directed by Leslie S. Hiscott and starring Edmund Gwenn, Barry MacKay and Aileen Marson.

It was made as Beaconsfield Studios as a quota quickie. The film's sets were designed by Norman G. Arnold.

Cast
 Edmund Gwenn as David Lawrence  
 Barry MacKay as Jim Lawrence  
 Aileen Marson as Mary Willett  
 D. A. Clarke-Smith as Stranger  
 Viola Lyel as Mrs. Willett 
 Wally Patch as Sergeant  
 John Turnbull as Inspector Goodall  
 Barbara Everest as Mrs. Lawrence  
 Beatrice Marsden as Mrs. Smith

References

Bibliography
 Chibnall, Steve. Quota Quickies: The Birth of the British 'B' Film. British Film Institute, 2007.
 Low, Rachael. Filmmaking in 1930s Britain. George Allen & Unwin, 1985.
 Wood, Linda. British Films, 1927-1939. British Film Institute, 1986.

External links
 

1934 films
British mystery films
1930s English-language films
Films directed by Leslie S. Hiscott
Films shot at Beaconsfield Studios
Quota quickies
British black-and-white films
1934 mystery films
1930s British films